C.J. Tudor is a British author whose books include The Chalk Man and The Hiding Place (The Taking of Annie Thorne). She was born in Salisbury, England but grew up in Nottingham, where she still lives.

The Chalk Man

The Chalk Man was published in January 2018 by Crown Publishing. Reviews were mixed. The Sun said "[Tudor] weaves a complex and captivating story in her first novel.". The Irish Independent said the book "has an intriguing and creepy premise - but ultimately falls apart after a series of improbable, shading to outlandish, plot twists." The book received the 2019 Barry Award for Best First Novel.

The Sixth

A book which to be called "The Sixth" was planned in 2022. But with a difficult 12 months between 2020 and 2021, a manuscript was written (approximately 86,000 words) and submitted to the publisher. Unhappy with the result, Tudor got a return from her editor that the book didn't work and needed a complete re-write. Not willing to do the job, Tudor preferred to offer a new book to be published in January 2023 and her publisher will instead publish her first short story collection in Autumn 2022.

Bibliography

Books
 The Chalk Man
 The Taking of Annie Thorne (The Hiding Place)
 The Other People
 The Burning Girls
 “A Sliver of Darkness”
 “The Drift”

Short stories
 The Man in the Box-Included in "The Other People" audiobook
 The Lion at the Gate-Included in "The Other People" audiobook
 The February House-Included in "The Other People" audiobook
 Butterfly Island in After Sundown anthology

References

Further reading
 The Hindu
 Associated Press
 Kirkus Reviews
 Kirkus Reviews
 Publishers Weekly

Living people
Year of birth missing (living people)
English women novelists
Barry Award winners
21st-century English novelists
People from Salisbury
People from Nottingham
21st-century English women